Karen Swanson is an American politician.

Swanson was affiliated with the Democratic Party, and won the 1974 and 1976 elections, serving as a member of the Massachusetts House of Representatives from the 14th Plymouth district.

References

Living people
Year of birth missing (living people)
20th-century American women politicians
20th-century American politicians
Massachusetts Democrats
Women state legislators in Massachusetts